An offensive coordinator is a member of the coaching staff of an American football or Canadian football team who is in charge of the team's offense.  Generally, along with the defensive coordinator and the special teams coordinator, this coach represents the second level of coaching structure after the head coach.

The offensive coordinator is in charge of the team's offensive game plan, and typically calls offensive plays during the game, although some offensive-minded head coaches also handle play-calling. Several position coaches work under the offensive coordinator (position groupings can include quarterbacks, wide receivers, offensive line, running backs, and tight ends).

Unlike most position coaches in football, who are usually on the sidelines during games, offensive coordinators have the option of operating from the press box instead of being on the sideline. 

From 2009 to 2019, nearly 40% of head coaches hired in the NFL had previously been offensive coordinators.

See also
 List of current National Football League offensive coordinators
 :Category:National Football League offensive coordinators

References

American football occupations
Offensive coordinator